The Hawaiʻi Rainbow Wāhine softball team represents the University of Hawaiʻi at Mānoa in NCAA Division I college softball. The team participates in the Big West Conference (BWC). The Rainbow Wahine are currently led by head coach Bob Coolen. The team plays its home games at Rainbow Wahine Softball Stadium located on the university's campus.

Coaching history

Home stadium

Rainbow Wahine Softball Stadium is located on the university's campus, and is currently the home venue for the softball program.  The stadium was named the Wahine Softball Field when it first opened in 1985, but was renamed  in 1998 when renovations expanding the seating capacity to 1,200 were completed.  The stadium also underwent renovations between the 2017 and 2018 seasons, when artificial turf and additional netting were installed, as well as the entire stadium being pinted.  As of 2021, the stadium is undergoing additional renovations: a new clubhouse holding coaches' offices and a locker room for players is expected to be completed by Summer 2021.

See also
List of NCAA Division I softball programs

References

External links